Uspensky is a Russian-language surname.

Uspensky of Uspenski may also refer to:

Uspensky (rural locality), multiple rural communities with this name in Russia
 Uspensky District, a district in Krasnodar Krai
 Uspenski Cathedral, an Eastern Orthodox cathedral in Helsinki, Finland
Dormition Cathedral (disambiguation), the names of many of these may be occasionally transliterated from Russian "Успенский собор" as "Uspensky Sobor" or "Uspensky Cathedral"

See also

Surnames